Frank Marion Thomas Jr. (April 9, 1921 – May 11, 2006), was an American actor, author and bridge-strategy expert who played both lead and supporting roles on Broadway, in films, in post-World War II radio, and in early television. He was best known for his starring role in Tom Corbett, Space Cadet.

Early years
Thomas was born in New York City to actors Frank M. Thomas and Mona Bruns. His uncle, Calvin Thomas, was also an actor.

Thomas portrayed a Kiowan youth in the Broadway play Carry Nation (1932). He appeared in six other Broadway plays between 1932 and 1936, including Little Ol' Boy, Thunder on the Left, Wednesday's Child, The First Legion, Remember the Day, and Seen But Not Heard.

In Wednesday's Child he played the role of Bobby Phillips, the longest stage part ever written for a child performer. Thomas also developed a lifelong fascination with the character of Sherlock Holmes during this period, when he saw William Gillette perform the part during his farewell tour.

When Wednesday's Child was filmed in 1934, Thomas and his family traveled to Hollywood. His parents found character parts in films, while Thomas played the role of Bobby Phillips for the cameras. The following year he played Nello Daas in the film adaptation of the novel, A Dog of Flanders, by Ouida.

In 1937 he appeared in the serial Tim Tyler's Luck, based on the comic strip by Lyman Young. Thomas often said that the serial was his equivalent of attending college, since he met so many notable silent-film stars who were in the cast. When not busy in Hollywood, Thomas would return to Broadway; however, after the serial, he was seen on Broadway only once more, briefly, after five years.

Thomas's last "A" film was Boys' Town (1938) with Spencer Tracy and Mickey Rooney. Thomas was Freddy Fuller, Boys' Town's mayor, and was not asked to appear in the sequel, Men of Boys' Town (1941). He then appeared in a string of "B" films such as Little Tough Guys in Society and Nancy Drew... Detective (both 1938), Nancy Drew... Reporter, Code of the Streets, Nancy Drew… Trouble Shooter, The Angels Wash Their Faces, 
Nancy Drew and the Hidden Staircase, On Dress Parade and Invisible Stripes (all 1939).

In the summer of 1940, Thomas acted with the Guy Palmerton Players.

In 1941 he had small parts in Flying Cadets and One Foot in Heaven. His last film roles were small roles in Always in My Heart and The Major and the Minor (1942), where he played a military school cadet who flirted with Ginger Rogers' character. His last appearance on Broadway was in Your Loving Son, which closed after just two performances in April 1941.

Later years

With the entry of the United States into World War II, Thomas joined the US Navy in 1942. He was commissioned and assigned to the United States Coast Guard. He served as third officer on patrols in the Atlantic, and was discharged in Philadelphia in 1944.
 
Following the war, Thomas and his parents lived in Manhattan and worked in the daily and weekly radio series originating in the studios of the four major networks. By 1948 all three Thomases had moved into television. In 1949 Frankie Thomas was a regular on two pioneering TV soap operas, A Woman to Remember and One Man's Family.

In the fall of 1950 he became the idol of millions of children when he played the starring role in Tom Corbett, Space Cadet, beginning on CBS and transferring to ABC in January 1951. Thomas had beaten out Jack Lemmon for the part. The series continued its three-a-week 15-minute broadcasts until the spring of 1952. Kinescopes were rebroadcast on NBC in the summer of 1951, with live introductions by Thomas as Tom Corbett. During the spring of 1952, the TV cast of Tom Corbett also performed a twice-a-week 30-minute broadcast on ABC radio.

The TV series reappeared on DuMont, alternating Saturdays with Secret Files of Captain Video for 30 minutes, before going off the air in May 1954. Thomas became a regular on the soap opera First Love, but in December 1954, Tom Corbett began on NBC, running until June 1955. By this time Tom Corbett's rivals Captain Video and Commander Buzz Corry of Space Patrol had been off the air for several months. None of the science fiction series was ever revived, though there was talk of doing so in 1957, in the aftermath of Sputnik.

Tom Corbett had the distinction of appearing on all four Golden-Age TV networks, and during the summer of 1951 appeared on two different networks simultaneously. Like most child stars, Thomas never made the transition to adult roles. Despite the fact that he was 34 years old at the end, his Tom Corbett character was supposedly a teenager attending Space Academy to become an officer of the Solar Guard.

In 1956, Thomas and his now-retired parents returned to California, where he appeared in a few radio series such as Suspense and wrote soap-opera scripts. He turned his hobby of bridge into a career, becoming the editor of several bridge-related periodicals and president of the American Bridge Teachers' Association. He wrote several books on bridge. Thomas traveled the country to compete in bridge tournaments and to instruct in the game's strategies.

In 1957, Thomas was once again connected with Nancy Drew when he starred as Carson Drew in a pilot for CBS. He co-starred with Roberta Shore and Tim Considine. The series was to be based on the 1930s films he starred in as Ted. In the late 1970s he began writing and publishing novels and short-story collections featuring consulting detective Sherlock Holmes. During the last decade of his life Thomas appeared as a celebrity guest at conventions on old-time radio, the Golden Age of Hollywood, and the Golden Age of Television. He often appeared wearing his original Tom Corbett uniform, which he still fit into.

Death
Frankie Thomas died in 2006 at age 85 at a Sherman Oaks, California, hospital of respiratory failure, following a stroke. At his request, he was buried in his Space Cadet uniform. He rests beside his parents at Forest Lawn Cemetery in the Hollywood Hills. His wife, Virginia, had preceded him in death in 1997.

Partial filmography

Film

Bibliography

References

 

 Holmstrom, John (1996). The Moving Picture Boy: An International Encyclopaedia from 1895 to 1995. Norwich: Michael Russell, p. 103-104.
 Willson, Dixie (1935). Little Hollywood Stars. Akron, OH, e New York: Saalfield Pub. Co.

External links

Frankie Thomas interview
 
 
 

1921 births
2006 deaths
20th-century American novelists
21st-century American novelists
American male child actors
American mystery writers
American male novelists
Burials at Forest Lawn Memorial Park (Hollywood Hills)
20th-century American male writers
21st-century American male writers
American male stage actors
20th-century American male actors
Film serial actors
United States Coast Guard personnel of World War II
United States Coast Guard officers
Deaths from respiratory failure